František Krištof Veselý (1903–1977) was a Slovak theatre and movie actor and singer.

Selected filmography
 Delightful Story (Rozkošný příběh, 1936)
 Country Girl (Děvčátko z venkova, 1937)
 Honeymoon Journey (Svatební cesta, 1938)
 The Reluctant Grandfather (Dědečkem proti své vůli, 1939)

References

Bibliography
 Stanislav J. Kirschbaum. The A to Z of Slovakia. Rowman & Littlefield, 2010.

External links

1903 births
1977 deaths
People from Skalica
Slovak male film actors